Schwartz may refer to:
Schwartz (surname), a surname (and list of people with the name)
Schwartz (brand), a spice brand
Schwartz's, a delicatessen in Montreal, Quebec, Canada
Schwartz Publishing, an Australian publishing house
"Danny Schwartz", a police detective in the film Heat portrayed by Jerry Trimble
C. F. Schwartz, Rev, an 18th-century missionary, member of the Church Mission Society, England, sent to India for missionary work
"The Schwartz", a parody of the Force from Star Wars in the 1987 comedy science-fiction film Spaceballs

See also
Schwarz (disambiguation)
Swartz (disambiguation)
Schwarcz, a surname